Yiğit Onan (born July 12, 2002) is a Turkish professional basketball player for Beşiktaş Emlakjet of the Basketbol Süper Ligi (BSL).

Professional career
Onan started his professional career at Fenerbahçe Beko in 2020–21 season.

On August 17, 2021, he has signed with Dynamic Belgrade of the Basketball League of Serbia.

On August 4, 2022, he has signed with Beşiktaş of the Basketbol Süper Ligi (BSL).

Personal life
Nance is the son of Ömer Onan, a former professional basketball player for the Efes Pilsen and Fenerbahçe.

References

External links
Yiğit Onan TBLStat.net Profile
Yiğit Onan Eurobasket Profile
Yiğit Onan TBL Profile

2002 births
Living people
Basketball League of Serbia players
Beşiktaş men's basketball players
Fenerbahçe men's basketball players
Forwards (basketball)
KK Dynamic players
Basketball players from Istanbul
Turkish expatriate basketball people in Serbia
Turkish men's basketball players